Akunin may refer to:
 
 Boris Akunin, pen name of a Georgian-Russian writer Grigory Shalvovich Chkhartishvili (born 1956)
Kakushi Toride no San-Akunin: The Last Princess, a 2008 Japanese film
Akunin (film), a 2010 Japanese crime noir film

See also 
 Villain (disambiguation)